Route 399 is a short  two-lane north/south highway located in the Abitibi-Témiscamingue region in Quebec, Canada. It starts at the junction of Route 111 in Trécesson and ends in the village of Berry.

Municipalities along Route 399

 Trécesson
 Berry

See also
 List of Quebec provincial highways

References

External links  
 Provincial Route Map (Courtesy of the Quebec Ministry of Transportation) 
 Route 399 on Google Maps

399
Roads in Abitibi-Témiscamingue